Ogden in West Yorkshire, England, is a small hamlet  north of Halifax. The hamlet falls within the Calderdale Ward of Illingworth and Mixenden.

See also
Wind power in the United Kingdom

References

External links

Geography of Calderdale
Villages in West Yorkshire
Wind farms in England